WMWV (93.5 FM) is a radio station broadcasting an Adult Album Alternative format.  Licensed to Conway, New Hampshire, United States, the station serves the Mount Washington Valley area.  The station is currently owned by Mt. Washington Radio & Gramophone, L.L.C. and features programming from AP Radio.

History
The station went on the air as WBNC-FM on June 23, 1967.  On November 2, 1979 the station changed its call sign to the current WMWV.

References

External links

MWV
Radio stations established in 1967
Adult album alternative radio stations in the United States
Carroll County, New Hampshire